Paul Sudhir Arul Kalanithi (April 1, 1977 – March 9, 2015) was an American neurosurgeon and writer. His book When Breath Becomes Air is a memoir about his life and illness with stage IV metastatic lung cancer. It was posthumously published by Random House in January 2016. It was on The New York Times Non-Fiction Best Seller list for multiple weeks.

Early life and education
Paul Kalanithi was born on April 1, 1977, and lived in Westchester, New York. He was born to a Christian family hailing from Tamil Nadu and Andhra Pradesh, India. Kalanithi had two brothers, Jeevan and Suman; Jeevan is a computer/robotics engineer and Suman is a neurologist. The family moved from Bronxville, New York, to Kingman, Arizona, when Kalanithi was 10. Kalanithi attended Kingman High School, where he graduated as valedictorian.

Kalanithi attended Stanford University, where he graduated with a Bachelor of Arts and a Master of Arts in English literature and a Bachelor of Science in human biology in 2000. After Stanford, he attended the University of Cambridge, where he studied at Darwin College and graduated with a Master of Philosophy in the History and Philosophy of Science and Medicine. Although he initially considered pursuing a Ph.D. in English Literature, Kalanithi then attended the Yale School of Medicine, where he graduated in 2007 cum laude, winning the Dr. Louis H. Nahum Prize for his research on Tourette’s syndrome. He was inducted into the Alpha Omega Alpha national medical honor society.

At Yale, Kalanithi met fellow medical student Lucy Goddard, who would become his wife.

Career
After graduating from medical school, Kalanithi returned to Stanford to complete his residency training in neurosurgery and a postdoctoral fellowship in neuroscience at Stanford University School of Medicine.

In May 2013, Kalanithi was diagnosed with metastatic stage IV non-small-cell EGFR-positive lung cancer. He died on March 9, 2015, aged 37.

Personal life
Kalanithi was married to Lucy (née Goddard), with whom he had a daughter in 2014, Elizabeth Acadia ("Cady"). Lucy is an associate professor at Stanford University School of Medicine and wrote the epilogue to When Breath Becomes Air. She is the twin sister of Joanna Goddard of the blog A Cup of Jo.

Although Kalanithi was raised in a devout Christian family, he turned away from the faith in his teens and twenties in favor of other ideas. However, he retained "the central values of Christianity — sacrifice, redemption, forgiveness" and returned to Christianity later in his life. In his book, he writes that if he had been more religious in his youth, he would have become a pastor.

He never smoked.

Bibliography

Non-fiction books
 When Breath Becomes Air

Essays
 "How Long Have I Got Left?" for The New York Times
 "Before I go: Time warps for a young surgeon with metastatic lung cancer" for Stanford Medicine Magazine
 "My Last Day as a Surgeon" for The New Yorker
 "Terra Incognita: Remembering Sherwin Nuland" for The Paris Review

Scholarly articles
Only first-authored articles are listed below
 O'Shea DJ*, Kalanithi P*, Ferenczi EA*, Hsueh B, Chandrasekaran C, Goo W, Diester I, Ramakrishnan C, Kaufman MT, Ryu SI, Yeom KW, Deisseroth K, Shenoy KV. Scientific Reports. 2018 Apr 30;8(1):6775. . *Co-first author.
 
 
 
 
 
  father. name.

References

External links
 

1977 births
2015 deaths
21st-century American writers
Alumni of the University of Cambridge
Alumni of Darwin College, Cambridge
American male writers of Indian descent
American neuroscientists
American neurosurgeons
Deaths from lung cancer
People from Kingman, Arizona
Stanford University alumni
Writers from Arizona
Yale School of Medicine alumni
American Christians